Bobsleigh at the 1992 Winter Olympics consisted of two events, at La Plagne.  The competition took place between February 15 and February 22, 1992.

Medal summary

Medal table

Three countries won medals in Albertville, with Maslanka-McDonnell team leading the medal table, with two medals, one gold and one bronze. Germany won the most medals, with three. Gustav Weder and Donat Acklin were the only athletes to medal in both competitions.

Events

Participating NOCs
Twenty-five nations participated in bobsleigh at the 1992 Games. Ireland, Latvia, Puerto Rico and the Unified Team made their bobsleigh debuts.

References

External links
Wallechinsky, David and Jaime Loucky (2009). "Bobsleigh". In The Complete Book of the Winter Olympics: 2010 Edition. London: Aurum Press Limited.

 
1992
1992 Winter Olympics events
1992 in bobsleigh